Elizabeth Gwendoline Nerys Evans (born 1980) is a Welsh politician. She was a member of the National Assembly for Wales representing Plaid Cymru in the Mid and West Wales region. She contested the Carmarthen West and South Pembrokeshire seat for the 2011 National Assembly for Wales elections, finishing in third place, and thus lost her seat in the Assembly.

Background
Evans was born in Llangain near Carmarthen. She was educated at Manchester University where she obtained a BA in Government and Political Theory, followed by Cardiff University where she was awarded a MSc in Welsh Politics in 2004.

Political career
She became an organiser for Plaid Cymru in Carmarthen East and Dinefwr and worked as press officer for the Plaid Cymru group on Carmarthenshire County Council. More recently she worked as a Political Officer for Plaid Cymru in the National Assembly for Wales in Cardiff.

In 2006, Evans was chosen to head the Plaid Cymru list in Mid and West Wales for the 2007 Assembly election.  On election day she took the seat vacated by Helen Mary Jones, who succeeded in winning the Llanelli constituency.

Her political interests include rural affairs, voter apathy and workers' rights. She was Plaid Cymru’s Education Spokesperson from 2009 – 2011. She was chair of the Assembly Cross Party group for Broadband in rural Wales, she sat on the Assembly's Enterprise and Learning committee and is a former chair of the Broadcasting Sub Committee.  In 2008 Nerys won the annual ITV Wales Campaigner of The Year award for her campaigning work on domestic abuse issues.
She is Plaid Cymru – The Party of Wales' Director of Policy and sits on the party's National Executive Committee.

References

External links
Biography on Plaid Cymru site 
Plaid Cymru – the Party of Wales Website

Offices held

1980 births
Alumni of the University of Manchester
Alumni of Cardiff University
Wales AMs 2007–2011
Plaid Cymru politicians
Living people
Welsh-speaking politicians